John Joseph Ferguson (12 December 1904 – 23 February 1973) was an English footballer who played for a number of clubs as a forward.

Clubs
He turned out for Grimsby Town, Workington, Spen Black and White, Wolverhampton Wanderers, Watford, Burton Town, Manchester United, Derry City, and Gateshead.

External links
MUFCInfo.com profile

1904 births
1973 deaths
English footballers
English Football League players
Workington A.F.C. players
Grimsby Town F.C. players
Manchester United F.C. players
Wolverhampton Wanderers F.C. players
Watford F.C. players
Derry City F.C. players
Gateshead A.F.C. players
Burton Town F.C. players
Spen Black and White F.C. players
Association football forwards